Parablennius is a diverse genus of combtooth blennies found in the Atlantic, western Pacific, and Indian oceans.

Species
There are currently 26 recognized species in this genus:
 Parablennius cornutus (Linnaeus, 1758)
 Parablennius cyclops (Rüppell, 1830)
 Parablennius dialloi Bath, 1990
 Parablennius gattorugine (Linnaeus, 1758) – Tompot blenny
 Parablennius goreensis (Valenciennes, 1836)
 Parablennius incognitus (Bath, 1968) – Mystery blenny
 Parablennius intermedius (J. D. Ogilby, 1915) – Horned blenny
 Parablennius laticlavius (Griffin, 1926) – Crested blenny
 Parablennius lodosus (J. L. B. Smith, 1959) – Mud blenny
 Parablennius marmoreus (Poey, 1876) – Seaweed blenny
 Parablennius opercularis (J. A. Murray, 1887) – Cheekspot blenny
 Parablennius parvicornis (Valenciennes, 1836) – Rock-pool blenny
 Parablennius pilicornis (G. Cuvier, 1829) – Ringneck blenny
 Parablennius postoculomaculatus Bath & Hutchins, 1986 – False Tasmanian blenny
 Parablennius rouxi (Cocco, 1833) – Longstriped blenny
 Parablennius ruber (Valenciennes, 1836) – Portuguese blenny
 Parablennius salensis (Bath, 1990
 Parablennius sanguinolentus (Pallas, 1814) – Rusty blenny
 Parablennius serratolineatus Bath & Hutchins, 1986
 Parablennius sierraensis Bath, 1990
 Parablennius tasmanianus (J. Richardson, 1842) – Tasmanian blenny
 Parablennius tentacularis (Brünnich, 1768) – Tentacled blenny
 Parablennius thysanius (D. S. Jordan & Seale, 1907) – Tasseled blenny
 Parablennius verryckeni (Poll, 1959)
 Parablennius yatabei (D. S. Jordan & Snyder, 1900) – Yatabe blenny
 Parablennius zvonimiri (Kolombatović, 1892) – Zvonimir's blenny

References

 
Salarinae